Ronald F. Hagerthy (born March 9, 1932) is an American actor on television and in films.

Early years
Hagerthy was born in Aberdeen, South Dakota, but moved to Glendale, California, before he started school. He attended Glendale City College and once worked as an ambulance driver. His acting career was interrupted by two years' service in the Army.

Career 
On television, in the 1950s, Hagerthy portrayed Clipper King (nephew of the title character) in the modern  Western series, Sky King. He also appeared on Matinee Theater, Bonanza, Gunsmoke, Navy Log, and Tales of Wells Fargo.

On film, Hagerthy portrayed Dick Cvetic in I Was a Communist for the FBI (1951) and Cpl. Rich Williams in Starlift (1951). He also appeared in Make Haste to Live, Eighteen and Anxious, Charge at Feather River, City That Never Sleeps, and Force of Arms.

Personal life 
Hagerthy married Patti Taylor, who was his sweetheart from his school days.

References

External links

1932 births
Living people
American male television actors
American male film actors
Male actors from South Dakota
Military personnel from South Dakota
People from Aberdeen, South Dakota
Western (genre) television actors